The COVID-19 pandemic in Romania is part of the ongoing pandemic of coronavirus disease 2019 caused by severe acute respiratory syndrome coronavirus 2. The virus was confirmed to have reached Romania on 26 February 2020, when the first case in Gorj County was confirmed.

, the National Institute of Public Health has reported around 2,200,000 cases, 1,800,000 recoveries, and 60,000 COVID-19-related deaths. More than 11.7 million RT-PCR tests and more than 7.3 million rapid antigen tests have been processed.

An anti-COVID-19 vaccination campaign, part of a global effort to slow down the spread of the virus, started on 27 December 2020. , over 50% of the country's eligible population received at least one dose of the COVID-19 vaccine as part of an ongoing national vaccination campaign.

As of 21 January 2023, 16,102,916 COVID-19 vaccine doses had been administered in Romania.

Background 
On 12 January, the World Health Organization (WHO) confirmed that a novel coronavirus was the cause of a respiratory illness in a cluster of people in Wuhan City, Hubei, China, who had initially come to the attention of the WHO on 31 December 2019.

Unlike SARS of 2003, the case fatality ratio for COVID-19 has been much lower, but the transmission has been significantly greater, with a significant total death toll.

Timeline

21 February – 2 March 2020: First cases, early preventive measures 
On 21 February, following a COVID-19 pandemic in Italy, the Romanian government announced a 14-day quarantine for citizens returning from the affected regions.

On 22 February, the Romanian government announced several preventive measures including designation of five hospitals as isolation centres for new cases, purchase and placement of thermal scanners in international airports and specially designated lines for passengers coming from areas affected by COVID-19 outbreak.

On 25 February, new measures were imposed. Upon arrival on the Romanian territory, all asymptomatic travelers from the affected areas, respectively Hubei, the 11 localities in Italy, and any remaining passengers on the Diamond Princess cruise ship will go directly to the quarantine, for a period for 14 days. The other people coming from the Lombardy and Veneto regions will enter voluntary isolation at home for 14 days, upon arrival in Romania.

On 26 February, the Minister of Education and Research required schools to spread awareness about coronavirus.

On 28 February, the Romanian Orthodox Church suggested that followers use their own spoons and avoid the traditional kissing of icons in church.

On 2 March, more preventive measures were taken by the National Committee for Special Emergency Situations. Thus, citizens arriving from other provinces or cities in mainland China, other localities in the Lombardy, Veneto or Emilia-Romagna regions of Italy, as well as areas and localities in South Korea and Iran not previously specified for institutionalised quarantine, enter 14 days of self-isolation at home immediately upon returning to Romania.

8–13 March 2020: Ban on public gatherings, school and border closures 
On 8 March, the Head of the Department for Emergency Situations, Raed Arafat, announced a ban on all indoor or outdoor activities involving the participation of more than 1,000 people (these numbers were subsequently changed, see below). These restrictions are valid until 31 March, when a new assessment would be made. After Northern Italy was put under quarantine on 8 March, low-cost airline Wizz Air suspended all flights to Treviso and Bergamo until 3 April. Likewise, Blue Air cancelled all flights to and from Milan for 8 and 9 March. In the same day, flights from and to Italy have been suspended. In a press conference, Interior Minister Marcel Vela stated that if a school reports even a case, courses will be suspended throughout the school.

On 9 March, officials announced the cessation of flights to and from Italy, at all airports in the country, until 23 March. On the same day, the National Committee for Special Emergency Situations has decided to close all schools in Romania, from 11 March until 22, with the possibility of extending the measure. All bus rides and rail transport to and from Italy were suspended from 10 to 31 March. The committee also decided to establish a series of obligations for food units and for public and private providers of passenger transport, such as frequent disinfection of surfaces, avoiding crowds in commercial spaces, frequent disinfection of the passenger compartment in the means of transport, etc.

On 11 March, the Government published a list of fifteen guidelines regarding the "responsible social behavior in preventing the spread of coronavirus (COVID-19)". The authorities have imposed a ban on sports, scientific, religious, cultural or entertainment events with over 100 participants in closed spaces until 31 March. Likewise, the public activities for museums were suspended until 31 March.

On 12 March, Serbian authorities closed seven border points with Romania to prevent the spread of coronavirus. On the same day, the Romanian Ombudsman asked President Klaus Iohannis to declare the state of emergency and the Romanian Parliament to approve it. In a televised statement, the Secretary of State in the Ministry of Health, Nelu Tătaru, said that the current situation does not impose such an extreme measure. The Romanian Football Federation decided to postpone all football matches in Romania until 31 March. Interior Minister Marcel Vela announced that the border crossing points with low traffic have been closed so that employees there to be directed to high traffic posts. Health Minister Victor Costache issued an order prohibiting the export of medicines and medical equipment for six months.

On 13 March, former admiral, who acts as an independent in the PNL senators' group, was diagnosed with COVID-19. He isolated himself after finding out that a French parliamentarian, with whom he had been traveling to Brussels, was found with coronavirus. On 9 March, Chițac attended a party meeting with over 100 people. Parliamentary sources claim that he was also present in the Senate on 12 March, when he attended the group and plenary sessions. In these conditions, all members of the National Political Bureau of PNL self-isolated at home. Interim Prime-minister Ludovic Orban announced that all PNL senators have an obligation to isolate themselves and that he will self-isolate at Vila Lac 1. He also announced that all ministers will be tested for coronavirus and self-isolate.

14–21 March 2020: State of emergency 

On 14 March, after over 101 people had been diagnosed with coronavirus, Romania entered the third COVID-19 scenario. The third scenario goes from 101 to 2,000 cases. In the third scenario the doctors will perform epidemiological screening in the tents installed in the hospitals' yards, and the hospitals of infectious diseases will treat only cases of SARS-CoV-2 infection. Likewise, the authorities will be able to impose quarantine at home, not just in hospitals, as in many areas the capacities of medical units could be exceeded. At the same time, according to the plan in the third scenario, public gatherings with more than 50 people are banned. Three more liberals have been diagnosed with COVID-19, all contacts of senator Vergil Chițac. Marcel Ciolacu, President of the Chamber of Deputies, announced that the Parliament will suspend its activity for a week. However, the activities will be carried out online. The same day, President Klaus Iohannis announced his decision to decree the state of emergency in Romania starting 16 March.

On 16 March, Iohannis issued the decree establishing the state of emergency in Romania for a period of 30 days and insisted that the implementation of the measures included in the decree is being made gradually. The schools will be closed during the state of emergency. If necessary, prices may be capped on medicines and medical equipment, on strictly necessary foods and on public utility services (electricity and heat, gas, water supply, sanitation, fuels, etc.). Also, gradual measures can be taken, if the situation gets worse, only after an evaluation of the National Committee for Special Emergency Situations. These include temporary closure of restaurants, hotels, cafes, clubs, gradual closure of borders, or limiting or prohibiting the movement of vehicles or people in/to certain areas. On 19 March, the Parliament convened a joint online session and unanimously adopted the decree issued by Iohannis.

Until 17 March, the Ministry of Foreign Affairs facilitated the return to the country for 137 Romanians who were abroad, either as tourists, in transit, or in medical emergency situations and who were directly affected by the measures adopted by the states in which they were. Later that same day, the government issued its first Military Ordinance, in response to the ongoing health crisis. Four days later, on 21 March, a second Military Ordinance was issued: no groups larger than 3 people on the streets. Curfew from 10p.m. to 6a.m. All shopping centres were closed, except for the sale of food, veterinary or pharmaceutical products and cleaning services. It is forbidden for foreign citizens and stateless persons to enter Romanian territory, except through the specially organised transit corridor, further exceptions being made for other categories, such as residents, family members, and others.

22 March – 2 April 2020: First deaths, national lockdown, Suceava quarantine 

On 22 March, the first three deaths were reported in Romania. All three had preexisting conditions: one was on dialysis, one had terminal lung cancer, and one had diabetes. Over the following days, their numbers would increase. The hospital director was dismissed, shortly thereafter, for mismanagement.

Following a surge in new confirmed cases, on 24 March, the government announced Military Ordinance No.3, instituting a national lockdown and calling in the military to support police and Gendarmerie personnel in enforcing the new restrictions. Movement outside the home or household is prohibited, with some exceptions (work, buying food or medicine etc.). People over 65 were allowed to leave their homes only between 11a.m. and 1p.m. Two days later, on 26 March, the state airline TAROM suspended all internal flights.

A fourth Military Ordinance has been issued on 29 March, further strengthening previously imposed fines and restrictions. Two more would soon follow, issued close to the end of the next day; namely, a fifth, extending the ban on international travel, and a sixth, placing Suceava, along with eight adjacent communes, under total quarantine, the first Romanian city to be placed under complete lockdown since the start of the outbreak in late February, holding over a quarter of all infected cases, and about two-thirds of all infected medical personnel. Some hospital staff have quit, others have signed a petition stating they "are sent to death barehanded".

On 2 April, Harghita reported its first case, becoming the last county in Romania to report at least one case.

4 April – 14 May 2020: Face masks, Easter Week 

On 4 April, a seventh Military Ordinance was issued, further extending the national lockdown period, and imposing a second local quarantine on the town of Țăndărei, Ialomița County. On the same date, various counties and localities have started drafting local legislation requiring denizens to wear protection masks, whether professional or improvised. The next day, Raed Arafat posted an article on his official Facebook page, later picked up by the national media and other news outlets, encouraging citizens to wear protective masks, even if homemade. Prime minister Ludovic Orban, on the other hand, expressed doubts concerning not only the safety of homemade improvisations, but also about the necessary logistics for successfully implementing such a large scale operation, inasmuch as the demand would greatly outweigh the extant offer currently available on the market.

On 7 April, a 53-year-old paramedic from Suceava became the first reported casualty among Romanian medical personnel. As of 18 April, there were over a thousand infected medical staff in the country.

On 9 April, an eighth Military Ordinance came into effect, reinforcing previously adopted measures, prohibiting the export of certain basic foods, banning the commerce of majority share packages in the National Energetic System, recommending that residential buildings be equipped with sanitary products and that their stairways and elevators be periodically disinfected, and making provisions for various professional categories, such as fishing, apiculture, car service and dealership, the food market, pharmaceuticals, cross-border workers, social services, medical staff etc. A week later, on 16 April, a ninth Military Ordinance was issued.

On 21 April, over 300 new cases, representing two-thirds of the staff and patients of a local neuropsychiatric hospital, were reported in a village from Cornu Luncii commune in Suceava county, not belonging to those already placed under strict quarantine. On the previous day, Pimen Zainea, the Romanian Orthodox archbishop of Suceava, was flown into the Matei Balș Institute for Infectious Diseases in Bucharest, after testing positive for COVID-19, where he would pass away a month later. Saint John the New Monastery has been placed in lockdown, and an epidemiological investigation was initiated.

On 22 April, President Iohannis issued a press release, stating the government's intention to adopt, by mid-May, official legislation requiring citizens to wear surgical masks in public. That same day, Timișoara, Romania's third largest city, made the use of both facial masks and protection gloves mandatory in enclosed public spaces, including transportation. This decision came a week after Constanța, a major urban centre and one of the country's main tourist destinations, took similar measures on 15 April.

On 27 April, the tenth Military Ordinance came into effect. Except for work and medical emergency, people over 65 were only allowed to leave their homes between 7a.m. and 11a.m. and between 7p.m and 10p.m. Two weeks later, on 11 May, an eleventh Military Ordinance lifted the Țăndărei quarantine. Two days later, a further Military Ordinance lifted the Suceava quarantine. On 14 May, a thirty-day state of alert was decreed, starting the following day, thus ending the stricter state of emergency, in force until that date.

15 May – 13 September 2020: State of alert, relaxation measures 
The state of emergency ended on 14 May and was replaced by the state of alert, starting with 15 May, when the hairdressing salons, barbershops, dental offices and museums were reopened. Leaving the city of residence, possible only with a statement and reason and those who return to the country are isolated at home. The malls with an area under 15,000 sq m are reopened.

250 thousand Romanians donated for the construction of the most modern modular coronavirus hospital. The hospital was ready in two weeks.

Archbishop Theodosius of Thomis shared several children using the same teaspoon and the same chalice, defying the rules imposed by the authorities and the Holy Synod.

New sanctions from 1 July: suspension of the operating license for organizers of activities and events that do not comply with anti-COVID rules.

Images with dozens of people singing and dancing, in Vama Veche, without taking into account the distance rules imposed due to the COVID-19 pandemic, have appeared on social networks. The administrator of a club, fined 2,000 lei.

Two PSD deputies - Adrian Solomon and Irinel Stativa - refused to wear a mask in a fast food restaurant in sector 3 and quarreled with the police were fined and for not wearing a protective mask, according to the law on alert status . The announcement was made by the Capital Police, which states that in the meantime the images captured by the video cameras in the place were viewed. Parliamentarians were initially fined for causing a scandal.

The state of alert in Romania extended by 30 days, President Klaus Iohannis announced. He said no new restrictions would be imposed, but there would be no new easing measures.

The new restrictions that came into force on 1 August: The protective mask will be mandatory in open spaces, at certain time intervals, which will be set by the county authorities, and the premises with terrace will be open only until 23.00. Specifically, "the sale and consumption of food, alcoholic and non-alcoholic beverages in specially designated areas between 23.00 and 06.00 will be prohibited." The gambling halls will also be closed at the same time.

The National Committee for Emergency Situations has adopted Decision number 43 which provides for the reopening starting with 1 September 2020 of restaurants and cafes inside buildings, including in the case of accommodation units, the limitation at national level of the operation of terraces between 06.00- 24.00 and increasing the number of people who can participate in private events to 50 in an enclosed space, respectively 100 in an open space. However, the clubs and discos inside will remain closed.

The Ministry of Health has published the epidemiological analysis by counties and localities which shows the incidence rate of coronavirus infections per thousand inhabitants, essential data for the beginning of the new school year. The epidemiological criterion based on which the educational units / institutions establish one of the 3 scenarios is the cumulative incidence rate, respectively the total number of new cases in the last 14 days compared to 1000 inhabitants: Scenario 1 - green - school starts with the physical presence of all students - Incidence rate less than 1 per thousand inhabitants; Scenario 2 - yellow - hybrid scenario - Only students in grades VIII and XII will participate physically daily in classes, while the rest of the students will return partially (by rotation every 1–2 weeks). Incidence rate between 1 and 3 per thousand inhabitants; Scenario 3 - red - Online school only - Incidence rate higher than 3 per thousand inhabitants.

14 September – 5 November 2020: First reopening of schools, local elections, surge of cases

6 November 2020 – 7 February 2021: Partial lockdown, legislative elections, vaccination campaign 

The resurgence in new infections, hospitalizations and deaths have resulted in imposing of new restrictions that took effect on 9 November. They included the closure of schools, a curfew between 23:00 and 5:00, the requirement of wearing face masks in both open and closed areas nationwide, and the closure of agri-food markets in closed areas. Remote work was encouraged where possible. Leaving the home or household during the curfew was prohibited, with some exceptions, while only gas stations, pharmacies, and economical operators with home delivery activities were allowed to operate after 21:00.

The Romanian authorities were criticized for not delaying the 2020 legislative elections past 6 December, as well as for the closure of agri-food markets and the lack of testing compared to other European countries. They've defended their decisions by saying that "democracy cannot be put in parenthesis", that "agri-food markets in closed areas are super-spreaders", and that "there are no requests for testing". President Iohannis announced on 2 December that agri-food markets in closed areas would reopen beginning "the end of the current week (at the time of the issuing of the press release)".

On 27 December, at the same time as other member states of the European Union, in which Romania was a member of, the vaccination campaign had started, the process being divided into three phases.

On 28 December, the then-new Minister of Education, Sorin Cîmpeanu, announced the Ministry's intention to reopen schools starting 8 February, when the second semester would begin. This was conditioned by the evolution of the pandemic, if the number of new cases will surge after the Winter holidays or not, as well as by how other countries managed the situation. Until then, schools continued their activity online.

The first case with the more contagious British COVID-19 strain (Lineage B.1.1.7) was confirmed in Romania on 8 January, on a woman from Giurgiu County. She, however, did not travel outside Romania. It was followed by 16 other cases in an outbreak at the School No. 28 of Bucharest.

On 15 January, Romania entered the second phase of the process of vaccinating against COVID-19, when President Iohannis was vaccinated against the virus.

On 18 January, the National Committee for Emergency Situations had decided to exempt the people who have gotten the second dose of the COVID-19 vaccine at least 10 days prior to their arrival in Romania from countries considered high-risk. If the vaccinated person arrives in the country with their children, they would still have to remain in quarantine with them, because the vaccines that were authorized at the time cannot be administered on children.

The final decision on schools was made on 2 February. In a press release issued by President Klaus Iohannis on that day, he announced that schools will reopen on 8 February, based on local incidence rates, after a review of the epidemiological situation in Romania and of what other member states of the European Union do. Students would be tested for COVID-19 in school if it presents symptoms of the virus during courses, with the agreement of their parents. Cîmpeanu stated that the usage of transport services for school should not be a factor of transmission.

8 February – 8 March 2021: Second reopening of schools, spread of new variants 
On 8 February, schools were reopened for the second time during the pandemic. Unlike in fall 2020, schoolwide restrictions based on the three scenarios were different. Thus, in the yellow scenario, unless the student attends primary education or is in a final year, every student attends courses exclusively online. Only primary school students would attend school physically in the red scenario.

On 10 February, prime minister Florin Cîțu announced that the incidence rate of COVID-19 cases would begin to include outbreaks in over 14 days from the announcement date, with the state of alert being prolonged with 30 more days. The following day, the first case among students who participate physically since 8 February was detected, on a girl in 2nd grade from Bucharest. Four other cases were detected at noon, which included one teacher, before the number of detected cases of infected students and school personnel began to surge throughout the day. In total, there were 244 students and 329 school personnel that were infected with COVID-19 since 8 February, all of which cases were, according to the Ministry of Education, based on infection in the week before the reopening of schools. In a press release on the same day, president Iohannis said that the situation is good after the reopening of schools.

The total number of infections in schools exceeded 1,000 by 17 February, when 600 students and 472 school personnel were reported to have been tested positive since the reopening.

On 18 February, MedLife announced that the Lineage B.1.1.7 strain had become the dominant variant in Romania's major cities and that it would most likely become the most frequent variant in the country in around 3–5 weeks. They've analyzed 90 samples, and 50% of them contained the strain that originated from the United Kingdom.

On 24 February, the National Institute of Public Health had done an analysis on the evolution of the pandemic in Romania. They estimated a new resurgence in new infections, with the worst scenario being a rise by 4% in new cases, to a medium amount of almost 9,000 new infections per day by 20 March. The incidence rate of cases began including outbreaks from 26 February 2021, as announced earlier.

On 27 February, the Minister of Education Sorin Cîmpeanu proposed that students in the VIII and XII grades mandatorily go physically to school in localities in the red scenario, as they attend national exams during summer. The next day, the National Council of Students said it disapproves this idea due to the high-risk of infection in these localities and asked the Ministry to adopt a measure in which students/parents have the freedom to choose between physical and digital learning.

The third wave had become noticeable in statistics by 2 March. Experts say that the third wave would this time affect younger people more than adults. More counties and localities have entered the red scenario, in which several restrictive measures were taken, including closure of schools for students in the 8th and 12th grades, restaurants, cafes, gambling halls, cinemas and cultural institutions.

On 5 March, the first two cases of the South African variant, the Lineage B.1.351, were confirmed in Romania, in patients from Bucharest and Pitești respectively. The same day, the National Committee for Emergency Situations adopted Decision number 15 which modifies the common agreement between the Ministries of Health and Education on the functioning of schools during the pandemic, so that students in 8th and 12th grades are allowed to participate physically in school no matter what, unless the locality the school is located in is quarantined. A common agreement between the Ministries of Health and Education issued on the next day mentioned that only up to half of students of every class of 8th and 12th grades would physically attend school. In addition, face masks were no longer mandatory for during physical education (if in outdoor) and for preschoolers regardless of age.

On 8 March, the first two cases of the Brazilian variant were confirmed in Romania, both in Bucharest.

9–25 March 2021: Third wave of cases
On 9 March, as the number of new cases in 24 hours was nearing 5,000, President Klaus Iohannis issued a press release, where he announced that the night curfew would begin an hour earlier, at 22:00 (10:00 pm). He also stated that there would never be a nationwide lockdown interfering with the Easter holidays of 2021 as a measure to curb the third wave of cases.

On 15 March, Romania entered the third phase of the process of vaccination against COVID-19. This is the final phase, in which the general population who meet the minimum eligibility age (16) would be vaccinated.

On 23 March, the Minister of Education Sorin Cîmpeanu announced the modification of the 2020–2021 school year structure so that students would be on holiday between 2 April and 4 May, to reduce mobility amid the third wave of infections.

On 25 March, the government announced a series of new restrictions. This included closure of gyms in localities where the incidence rate exceeded 4/1,000 inhabitants, while on Friday and at the weekend, the night curfew would begin at 20:00, with activity of economic operators allowed until 18:00. In localities where the incidence rate was over 7,5/1,000 inhabitants, imposed restrictions on Friday and the weekend would apply every day. The same day, Cîmpeanu announced that the school holiday would be interrupted between 12 and 29 April for students in their final years; all schools remained closed but distance education would be used. In addition, the school holiday was set to end on 9 May for these students.

10 August–20 October 2021: Fourth wave of cases
The fourth wave has been the most severe of all infection waves in the COVID-19 pandemic. Romania is the European Union member state with the second lowest percentage of fully-vaccinated people, after Bulgaria. Romania has been hitting record highs in the infections and deaths toll, occupying the 3rd place in new deaths and the 4th place in new infections worldwide on 13 October, and 2nd highest per capita COVID-19 death rate in the world . Roughly 13% of the 42,000 overall epidemic-related deaths have occurred in October, with the low vaccination rate exposing entrenched distrust in state institutions, misinformation campaigns, poor rural infrastructure and weak vaccine education.

The pressure on the Romanian healthcare system that reached its maximum capacity in the fourth wave led to the authorities asking the European Union for help through its Civil Protection Mechanism. Furthermore, the World Health Organization (WHO) was also concerned, with the fourth wave in Romania prompting them to have a teleconference with the National Institute of Public Health (INSP) on the matter on 18 October 2021.

Despite the severity of this wave compared to others, the Romanian government had chosen to take a slightly more relaxed approach, unwilling to close the economy even partially in any way, shape or form. To avoid closures and radical restrictive measures, it had chosen to instead impose a digital green certificate requirement for some activities. Schools had been remaining open regardless of epidemiological situation, with Education Minister Sorin Cîmpeanu advocating strictly for the "close last, open first" strategy of school functioning. Schools would only close if at least half of its personnel and students were found infected, or at the directors' request. The Public Health Directorate (DSP) of Ilfov, one of the most affected counties by the fourth wave with an incidence rate of over 15/1,000 on 13 October 2021, set school closures countywide for at least 14 days starting 18 October, a decision severely criticized by Cîmpeanu, who was accused shortly afterwards by parents of ignoring health authorities. In localities with incidence rate over 6/1,000, face masks have been required in outdoor areas, while a night curfew was imposed. Vaccinated people wouldn't be affected this time by the curfew, which would apply between 20:00 and 5:00, and the unvaccinated was required to stay home and not go out for unessential tasks.

28 December 2021–present: Fifth wave of cases and aftermath
On 8 January 2022 Romania reintroduces mandatory face mask wearing in outdoor and indoor public spaces, reduces the operating hours and capacity of bars, restaurants, cinemas, gyms, and sporting events, and also reduces the quarantine period, amid concern that the next wave of COVID-19 could overwhelm the health system. On 21 January Romania reports a record 19,649 new cases of COVID-19 and the next day has exceeded 2 million COVID-19 cases since the beginning of the pandemic.

The state of alert initially decreed on 15 May 2020 and then continually renewed was finally lifted on 8 March 2022, upon the fall of the fifth wave of COVID-19 cases. This would also mean a series of relaxation measures. President Klaus Iohannis stated that this can be considered the start of "a new stage [of the pandemic]".

Vaccinations

Romania received the first 10,000 vaccines against the virus on 26 December 2020 and officially started the vaccination campaign on Sunday, 27 December. The first person who took the vaccine was a nurse from the Matei Bals Institute for Infectious Diseases in Bucharest. She was soon followed by several hundred doctors and nurses from COVID-19 dedicated hospitals throughout the country. Romania has contracted about 10 million vaccines made by BioNTech-Pfizer. Vaccination is free of charge and non-mandatory. By 27 January 2022, over 50% of the country's eligible population received at least one dose of the vaccine.

Local lockdowns

Impact

Economics 

 
During the second week of March, the Bucharest Stock Exchange recorded losses on all five trading sessions, the main index BET collapsing by 17.6%, the steepest decline since December 2018.

On 16 March, the National Bank of Romania announced a reference rate of 4.8242 lei/euro, a historical maximum for the single European currency against the leu. The leu continued its depreciation, reaching a maximum of 4.9156 lei/euro on 30 March 2021.

Romania's economy contracted by 4.7% in H1 of 2020, driven by a decline of 10.5% in Q2. On the demand side, exports of goods and services fell by 15.1% in H1 of 2020, as European trading partners were significantly affected by the crisis. Imports contracted less than exports (down 9.4%), leading to a 21% increase in the trade deficit in H1. The weakening of external demand from Europe alongside pandemic-related restrictions caused industry to contract by 14.1% in H1. The sharp decline in output led to deteriorating labor market conditions, with deeper effects noted for younger workers and women: job vacancies fell between Q1 and Q2 2020, while the unemployment rate increased to 5.4% in July from 4.1% in February. Job and household income losses were stemmed by the technical unemployment relief program, which covered 1.3 million beneficiaries during the state of emergency at a cost of approximately 370 million euros (0.2% of GDP).

According to the autumn economic forecasts published on 5 November by the European Commission, Romania's economy would record a contraction of 5.2% in 2020, less severe than initially estimated, thanks to investments and construction works. Also, Romania's budget deficit was expected to increase significantly, up to 10.3% of GDP, in the context in which the fiscal effort needed to combat the crisis was added to the past fiscal slippages. Consequently, Romania's debt-to-GDP ratio was forecast to increase from 35.3% in 2019 to 46.7% in 2020.

Education 
On 9 March 2020, interim Prime Minister Ludovic Orban announced the closure of all schools between 11 and 22 March. The measure targeted all kindergartens, primary, secondary and high schools in Romania, both public and private, according to Education Minister Monica Anisie. The decision affected 3.5 million students. Likewise, several universities in the major student centres suspended their courses. These include the University of Bucharest, the Bucharest Academy of Economic Studies, the Politehnica University of Bucharest, the Babeș-Bolyai University and the West University of Timișoara, among others. Furthermore, Anisie announced that, as a measure of prevention and control of the illnesses with COVID-19 in schools, the Ministry of Education had decided to suspend all county and regional school olympiads, as well as sports competitions. Schools were closed suddenly, without any prior preparation. The Ministry of Education was constantly encouraging teachers to continue the educational process online, but they were not offered any support, on a national level. The Government made available a single resource on the national public television channel TVR, a show called Teleșcoală (Teleschool), in which children could observe mathematics, Romanian, biology, history and geography classes. The program was divided into two sections, between 9 and 10 a.m. courses for the 8th grade and between 3 and 4 p.m. courses for the 12th grade; the courses could be watched both on TV and on TVR's YouTube channel. In the first week of broadcasting, the program was watched by 1.3 million people, being the most watched TVR content between 16 and 21 March.

On 16 March, Anisie announced that schools would remain closed while the state of emergency was in place, at least until after the Easter holidays.
On 1 April, in response to a fake news story which had gained traction on social media and was being distributed on WhatsApp, saying that students would have to return to school in less than a week, Anisie and the Ministry of Education issued an official statement condemning the spread of false information and promised to provide in the next few days the date for the reopening of schools, as well as the national examinations. On 6 April, Anisie announced the cancellation of national exam simulations, as well as of all school competitions and olympiads. The Minister of Education said that the Baccalaureate and the National Evaluation would most likely be held in July, all of the examinations excluding the second semester curriculum.

In May, four months before the start of the new school year, the Government announced the purchase of 250,000 tablets to facilitate distance learning activities. For these tablets, the Government has allocated 150 million lei from the reserve fund, both for devices and internet services. Previously, Anisie stated that approximately 250,000 students do not have access to technology and thus cannot attend online courses. Of the 250,000 tablets, around 82,000 were purchased through the National Office for Centralized Acquisitions. As of November, just over 43,000 were distributed to students.

A study conducted by World Vision Romania between 10 May and 27 June showed that approximately 40% of students in rural areas did not participate in online courses and only 64% of teachers organized such courses. Moreover, according to the same study, 1 in 4 rural schools does not have an internet connection, and 9 out of 10 do not have laptops, PCs or tablets for digital education.

In a government meeting on 5 November, President Klaus Iohannis announced a series of partial quarantine measures, including the closure of all schools nationwide and the transition to online education for the next 30 days. During this period, only nurseries and after-schools remained open. The president's announcement, later doubled by a government decision, sparked a wave of discontent. The National Council of Students announced in a statement that it disapproves of the measure, as many schools are located in communities where the transmission rate is less than 3 per thousand inhabitants and hundreds of thousands of students in Romania do not have the opportunity to access online courses due to lack of digital infrastructure. According to a survey by the National Federation of Parents' Associations, about 47.2% of parents considered that the closure of schools was not a good one for the education system, while 45.2% of them considered this decision as a necessary one.

On 7 November, Anisie announced that students will no longer take their theses in the 2020–2021 school year, which will be replaced by a summative evaluation.

Schools have been reopened nationwide on 8 February. Despite their autonomy in relation to education-related decisions, most universities did not resume regular, face-to-face, courses, mainly due to restrictions imposed to in-door group gatherings. However, as new cases have risen in the country, the structure of the 2020–2021 school year had been modified so the spring break starts in 2 April and ends in 4 May, however doesn't apply to students in terminal years, who would instead have to attend online courses between 12 and 29 April, with spring break ending in 9 May.

Schools reopened, once again, on 5 and 10 May respectively (depending on grade), but with two scenarios rather than three. Schools in localities with an incidence rate below 1/1,000 inhabitants would be completely open, while in localities with an incidence rate above 1/1,000 inhabitants only pupils in primary and special education, as well as students in either the 8th, 12th or 13th grades, in terminal years of postliceal and vocational education, and those who attend recovery courses would go physically to school, unless the locality is quarantined.

Sports 
The Romanian Football Federation and the Romanian Handball Federation decided to suspend all matches until 31 March. The rugby match between Romania and Belgium, to be held in Botoșani on 14 March, was postponed by Rugby Europe. The IWF Junior World Weightlifting Championships in Bucharest, scheduled for 14–21 March, were cancelled.

Tourism 

The Romanian tourism industry has been severely affected by the COVID-19 pandemic and the measures that have been taken in an attempt to stop the spread of the virus. Both hotels and travel agencies have seen massive decreases in bookings and cancellations of events. Since the beginning of March, the occupancy rate of hotels has decreased by 40% in Bucharest and by 50% in resorts. In the first nine months of the year, arrivals in tourist reception facilities decreased by 50.6%, overnight stays by 49.5%, and arrivals of foreign visitors decreased by 59%.

Teleworking has been a necessary practice for many firms and workers during the lockdown period of the COVID-19 crisis. Due to the nature of the activity, only 7% of jobs in hospitality industry can plausibly be performed at home. As of 28 April, the Ministry of Labor reported 114,494 individual employment contracts suspended in the hotels and restaurants sector.

Human rights 
The government's response to COVID-19 raised human rights concerns including in relation to policing, the right to freedom of peaceful assembly and the right to education.

On 16 March 2020, President Iohannis signed an emergency decree, giving authorities the power to remove, report or close websites spreading fake news about the COVID-19 pandemic, with no opportunity to appeal. On 30 March, the OSCE Representative on Freedom of the Media, Harlem Désir, expressed his concerns about the provisions of the emergency decree, noting that they "pose a risk of undue restriction to the work of journalists, of self-censorship for media actors trying to inform the public, and could even be counterproductive". Previously, several civil society organizations issued a manifesto to request for greater transparency of data related to the spread of COVID-19 in Romania.

On 19 March, Romania activated Article 15 of the European Convention on Human Rights, which allows signatories to derogate from the convention in times of a "public emergency threatening the life of the nation".

Cases 
Until 26 September 2021, the National Institute of Public Health reported 1,199,761 cases of COVID-19. Bucharest accumulates 17.2% of the total number of infections. It is followed by Cluj with 5.3%, Timiș with 5.1%, Ilfov with 4.2% and Constanța with 4%. 1 in 77 reported cases was recorded among medical staff. A study conducted by the Sanitary Solidarity Federation in October 2020 revealed that about 10% of respondents had already been infected with SARS-CoV-2. According to the same study, nurses have the largest share of all infected workers and have the highest percentage of infection among occupational categories.

As of 26 September 2021, there were 36,450 COVID-19-related deaths, with 9.1% of them reported in Bucharest, 4.5% in Prahova, 3.9% in Bihor, 3.8% in Timiș and 3.8% in Suceava. 85.8% of all deaths were in people over 60, and 57.7% of deaths were in men. 94.5% of the deceased had at least one associated comorbidity. A November 2020 study by the National Institute of Public Health on data from the records of 21,766 patients indicated that the main risk factors for death in patients with COVID-19 in Romania are cardiovascular diseases, chronic kidney diseases and cancer.

Statistics

Total confirmed cases by gender

Total confirmed cases by age 
As of 14 March 2021, the average age of cases is 48years. The average age of deaths is significantly higher, at 71years.

Cumulative cases

Nationwide

New cases per day

New deaths per day

New recoveries per day

New tested per day

RT-PCR tests processed per week

Rapid antigen tests processed per day

ICU patients

Cases by county

See also 
 List of hospital fires in Romania during the COVID-19 pandemic
 COVID-19 pandemic by country and territory
 COVID-19 pandemic in Europe
 COVID-19 pandemic in Moldova
 Moldovan–Romanian collaboration during the COVID-19 pandemic

References

External links 

 Interactive map with confirmed cases, people in quarantine, people in isolation, etc. (ArcGIS)
 Maps and statistics on the COVID-19 pandemic in Romania (geo-spatial.org)
 Graphs on the COVID-19 pandemic in Romania (graphs.ro)

 
2020 in Romania
2021 in Romania
Romania
2020 disasters in Romania
2021 disasters in Romania